Brian Elshot (born 18 January 2000) is a Surinamese footballer who plays for Leo Victor in the SVB Topklasse and for the Surinamese national team.

He made his international debut with Suriname U17 team with a 1–1 draw against Cuba U17.

On 13 October 2018, he scored his first international goal in his senior debut with a 5–0 victory over the British Virgin Islands.

International career

International goals
Scores and results list Suriname's goal tally first.

References

Living people
2000 births
Surinamese footballers
Suriname international footballers
Association football midfielders
S.V. Leo Victor players
Sportspeople from Paramaribo
Suriname youth international footballers
Suriname under-20 international footballers